Gallup High School (GHS) is a public high school in Gallup, New Mexico. Gallup High School is the largest high school in the Gallup-McKinley County School District. The school's campus is relatively new as GHS moved to its current location in 1998 and the old campus became known as Gallup Junior High School, which housed 8th and 9th grade students from 1998 to 2008. In the 2008–2009 school year, Gallup started splitting their 9th and 10th grade students with cross-town Miyamura High School. The Gallup High School attendance boundary after the split will be Gallup's westside and areas located west and north of town.

History

Wendell Hendricks became the principal in 1970.

Attendance boundary
In addition to portions of Gallup, it serves Crestview, Defiance, Manuelito, Mentmore, Purty Rock, Rock Springs, Tse Bonito, and Ya-ta-hey, as well as a small section of Catalpa Canyon.

Sports and activities 
Gallup High School is a member of NMAA's District 1-4A and is highly competitive in girls and boys basketball, the GHS Bengal Girls dance team, and boys and girls cross country. District 1-4A includes Miyamura High School (Gallup, NM), Shiprock High School (Shiprock, NM), Kirtland Central High School (Kirtland, NM), Aztec High School, Bloomfield High School (Bloomfield, NM)

Notable alumni 

 Timothy Bedah, painter and goldsmith

References

Public high schools in New Mexico
Gallup, New Mexico
Schools in McKinley County, New Mexico